The Fine Gold Intrusive Suite is one of several intrusive suites that crosses into Yosemite National Park. These also include

 Intrusive Suite of Buena Vista Crest
 Intrusive Suite of Jack Main Canyon
 Intrusive Suite of Merced Peak
 Intrusive Suite of Sonora Pass
 Intrusive Suite of Yosemite Valley
 Tuolumne Intrusive Suite

The Fine Gold Intrusive Suite is an intrusive suite which is massive (more than 3100 square kilometers) and long-lived (ca. 19 million years).

Where is intrudes

The Fine Gold Intrusive Suite intrudes both accreted oceanic terranes, and/or island-arc terranes, and, also continental crust.

References

External links and references

 The Fine Gold Intrusive Suite: The roles of basement terranes and magma source development in the Early Cretaceous Sierra Nevada batholith
 A large article

Geology of California
Geology of Yosemite National Park